Trillando la fina is the eighth and final studio album by Argentine hard rock and heavy metal band Almafuerte released in 2012.

Track listing
All lyrics by Ricardo Iorio. Music composed by Claudio Marciello.
Muere, monstruo muere
Trillando la fina
Pa' Pelusa
Si Me Ves Volver
Pa'l Recuerdo
Ciudad de Rosario
Mi Credo
La Llaga (metal version)
Glifosateando
Mamuil Mapu
Caballo Negro (instrumental)

Personnel
Ricardo Iorio - Vocals
Claudio Marciello - Guitars
Adrián Valencia - Drums
Roberto Ceriotti - Bass

References 

Almafuerte (band) albums